Rapala caerulea, the bush clover, is a butterfly of the family Lycaenidae. It was described by Otto Vasilievich Bremer and William Grey in 1851. It is found in north-eastern and central China, Taiwan, Korea and the Russian Far East.

The length of the forewings is 16–17 mm. The wings are light blue with a dark border, strongly widened on the forewings of females.

The larvae feed on Rosa multiflora and Rhamnus species.

Subspecies
Rapala caerulea caerulea
Rapala caerulea liliacea Nire, 1920 (Taiwan)

References

Butterflies described in 1851
Rapala (butterfly)